Bernard Zoniaba (1929 – 2001) was a Congolese politician and writer. Zoniaba worked as primary school superintendent, later becoming the Congolese representative to Unesco. In 1965 Zoniaba was appointed Minister of Information and Civic and Popular Education.

Bibliography
Les Rescapés de Mbirou, published in Romania, 1966
Hier et maintant, published by Nouvelles du Sud, Paris, 1993

References

1929 births
2001 deaths
Republic of the Congo writers
Government ministers of the Republic of the Congo
Permanent Delegates of the Republic of the Congo to UNESCO